Jiucheng is a town in Daozhen Gelao and Miao Autonomous County, Guizhou, China. It has been hailed as "Hometown of Nuo opera".

Etymology
The town was the capital of Zhen'an Zhou. After the relocation of the capital, it hence the name of "Jiucheng", which means "Old city".

Administrative division
As of 2016, the town is divided into six villages:
 Jiucheng 
 Hexi 
 Changba 
 Huaiping 
 Guanba 
 Yongcheng

Geography

Climate

Economy
The main industries in and around the town are breading industry and farming.

References

Bibliography

Towns of Zunyi